Neogirdharia is a genus of moths of the family Crambidae.

Species

References

Haimbachiini
Crambidae genera